Whelchel is a surname. Notable people with the surname include:

B. Frank Whelchel (1895–1954), American politician
Dan Whelchel (1894–1988), American football player
Hugh Whelchel (1900–1968), American football player
John Whelchel (1898–1973), United States Navy officer, American football player, coach and athletics administrator
Josh Whelchel (born 1987), American composer
Kristy Whelchel (born 1977), American women's soccer player
Lisa Whelchel (born 1963), American actor
Susan Whelchel, American politician